Talsupram (Lu 5-005 or Lu 5-003) is a selective norepinephrine reuptake inhibitor (NRI) which was investigated as an antidepressant in the 1960s and 1970s but was never marketed. Along with talopram, it is structurally related to the selective serotonin reuptake inhibitor (SSRI) citalopram.

See also 
 Talopram

References 

Antidepressants
Norepinephrine reuptake inhibitors
Benzo(c)thiophenes